Xylorycta is a genus of moths of the family Xyloryctidae. Xylorycta species are found in Africa and Australia and are strongly associated with the plant family Proteaceae, being found on Hakea, Lambertia, Grevillea, Leptospermum, Macadamia, Oreocallis, Persoonia and Telopea. The larvae of some species bore into stems or branches, or the flower spikes of Banksia, but most live in a silk gallery spun in the foliage.

The genus was first published by amateur entomologist Edward Meyrick in 1890 in Transactions of the Royal Society of South Australia. It is currently placed in the family Xyloryctidae. In older classifications it was placed in the subfamily Xyloryctinae, in the family Oecophoridae.

Species

Former species
 X. artigena Meyrick, 1914

References

 afromoths.net

 
Moths of Australia
Xyloryctidae
Moths of Africa
Taxa named by Edward Meyrick
Xyloryctidae genera